Kim Eriksen (born 10 February 1964) is a Danish former cyclist. He competed in the individual road race and the team time trial events at the 1984 Summer Olympics.

References

External links
 

1964 births
Living people
Danish male cyclists
Olympic cyclists of Denmark
Cyclists at the 1984 Summer Olympics
People from Silkeborg
Sportspeople from the Central Denmark Region